Raseborg sub-region  is a subdivision of Uusimaa and one of the Sub-regions of Finland since 2009.

The main tourist attraction of the region, but also one of the Top 10 Visitors Attractions in Finland is the Raseborg Castle (Raaseporin Linna). It is supposed that the castle was built by the royal council leader of Magnus IV of Sweden in 1370, besides to have sustained continuous developments up to the 16th century. Raseborg Castle was designed to defend the then Swedish territory of Southern Finland. It would also go on to be the focal point of clashes with the Danes as well as pirates.

The time being, visitors to Raseborg Castle can look at its restored outer wall as well as its other ruins, such as wooden barrier which in the past encircled the castle, stopping entrance to the harbour to foreign ships.

Municipalities
 Hanko (Hangö)
 Ingå (Inkoo)
 Raseborg (Raasepori)

Politics
Results of the 2018 Finnish presidential election:

 Sauli Niinistö   66.7%
 Pekka Haavisto   12.5%
 Nils Torvalds   7.4%
 Tuula Haatainen   4.0%
 Laura Huhtasaari   3.3%
 Paavo Väyrynen   3.1%
 Merja Kyllönen   2.0%
 Matti Vanhanen   0.9%

Sub-regions of Finland
Geography of Uusimaa